Aristaea onychota is a moth of the family Gracillariidae. It is known from Nigeria, Réunion, São Tomé and Príncipe, South Africa and Zambia.

The larvae feed on Lantana camara, Lantana rugosa, Lippia asperifolia and Lippia javanica. They mine the leaves of their host plant. The mine has the form of a moderate, oblong, semi-transparent, tentiform mine on the upper side of the leaf.

References

Aristaea
Moths described in 1908
Moths of Sub-Saharan Africa
Lepidoptera of West Africa
Moths of São Tomé and Príncipe
Lepidoptera of South Africa
Taxa named by Edward Meyrick